"Miss America" is a song recorded by Swedish singer Måns Zelmerlöw. It was released on 5 May 2008 as a digital download in Sweden. It was released as the fourth single from his studio album Stand by For... (2007). The song was written by Fredrik Kempe. It peaked at number 47 on the Swedish Singles Chart.

It also peaked at 16th position at Trackslistan and 35th position at Digilistan.

Track listing

Chart performance

Weekly charts

Release history

References

2007 songs
2008 singles
Songs about the United States
Måns Zelmerlöw songs
Songs written by Fredrik Kempe
English-language Swedish songs